Tinagma is a genus of moths in the Douglasiidae family. It is primarily found in the Palearctic and Nearctic realms

Species
Tinagma anchusella Benander, 1936
Tinagma balteolella (Fischer von Roslerstamm, 1840)
Tinagma bledella 
Tinagma brunneofasciatum Gaedike, 1990
Tinagma californicum Gaedike, 1990
Tinagma columbella 
Tinagma dryadis Staudinger, 1872
Tinagma giganteum Braun, 1921
Tinagma gaedikei Harrison, 2005
Tinagma grisecens 
Tinagma hedemanni Caradja, 1920
Tinagma klimeschi Gaedike, 1991
Tinagma leucanthes Meyrick, 1897
Tinagma mexicanum Gaedike, 1990
Tinagma minutissima Staudinger, 1880
Tinagma mongolicum Gaedike, 1991
Tinagma obscurofasciella (Chambers, 1881)
Tinagma ochremaculella (Chambers, 1875)
Tinagma ocnerostomellum (Stainton, 1850)
Tinagma perdicella (Zeller, 1839)
Tinagma powelli Gaedike, 1990
Tinagma pulverilinea Braun, 1921
Tinagma signatum Gaedike, 1991

References

 , 1987: Beitrag zur Kenntnis der paläarktischen Douglasiidae (Lepidoptera): Tinagma klimeschi sp. n., aus Rhodos. Nota Lepidopterologica 10 (3): 158—162.
 , 1990: Revision der nearktischen Douglasiidae (Lepidoptera). Beiträge zur Entomologie 40 (2): 287-300.
 , 1991: Neue und seltene Douglasiidae†. (Lepidoptera). Deutsche Entomologische Zeitschrift 38(1-3): 19-25. Abstract: .

Douglasiidae
Gracillarioidea genera